Krush may refer to:
 Krush, a British electronic music act
 DJ Krush, a Japanese DJ/producer
 Krush (album), DJ Krush's debut album
 Krush, a nickname for American professional bodybuilder Kristy Hawkins
 Irina Krush, American chess player and champion

See also 
 Crush (disambiguation)
 Krusz, a village in Poland